Yaşar Güler (born September 18, 1954) is a Turkish general who currently serves as the 30th Chief of the General Staff of the Turkish Armed Forces, serving in the position since he succeeded Hulusi Akar in July 2018.

Career
He enlisted in the army in 1974, which was effectively the start of his military career. He spent two years prior to his enlistment studying at the Turkish Military Academy. In the 10 years since joining the land forces, he served in various infantry and signals companies, acting as the commander of one of them. In 1986 he graduated from the Army War College with honors and graduated with the rank of a staff officer. He was promoted to brigadier general in 2001 and assumed responsibility for the 10th Infantry Brigade Command and the Planning and Coordination Department of the General Staff.

4 years later, he was promoted to major general and took over duties of the General Staff and at the School of Communications and Electronic Information Systems of the TAF in Ankara. In 2009, he was appointed to a position in the General Command of the 4th Army Corps, serving for over 2 years, this time as lieutenant general. From 2011 – 2013, he was the chief of intelligence for the armed forces, a position where he performed his duties before becoming the Deputy Chief of Staff in 2013, where he was also promoted to general and became the commander of the Gendarmerie General Command in 2016–2017, and became the Commander of Land Forces in 2017–2018, serving in those positions for a combined 5 years. On July 10, 2018, he was appointed by President Recep Tayyip Erdogan as the 30th General Staff of the Republic of Turkey of the Armed Forces, succeeding Hulusi Akar, who was promoted to the post of Minister of National Defence that same day.

He is currently married to Demet Güler, with whom he has a child. He has two grandchildren.

References

External links

1954 births
Living people
Turkish Army generals
Chiefs of the Turkish General Staff
People from Ardahan